The qualifying competition for the 1991 UNCAF Nations Cup was a football competition that was played from April 4, 1991, to May 12, 1991, to determine the 3 teams to join Costa Rica, who qualified automatically as hosts of the 1991 UNCAF Nations Cup. Six member associations participated in the qualifying process for the tournament places; however, Belize withdrew due to economic reasons.

Qualifying group stage

Groups

Group A

Group B

Group C

Belize withdrew from the tournament, so Guatemala qualified automatically.

Goalscorers

3 goals
  Raúl Díaz Arce
  Luis Orlando Vallejo

2 goals
  Livio José Bendaña

1 goal

  Guillermo Rivera
  Jorge Rodríguez

  Oberto Lynch

  Julio Dely Valdés

References

External links
  

Nations
1991
1991
1991 in Costa Rican sport